This list of best-selling films in the United States is a list of the best-selling home video film titles sold in the United States. This list only includes physical media (such as VHS, DVD and Blu-ray), and does not include digital purchases or video rentals.

Best-selling films
This is a list of the best-selling film titles sold in the United States across all physical home video formats, including VHS, DVD, and Blu-ray Disc (BD).

Best-selling films by format

VHS
This is a list of the best-selling VHS titles in the United States.

DVD
This is a list of the best-selling DVD titles in the United States.

Blu-ray
This is a list of the best-selling Blu-ray Disc (BD) titles in the United States.

LaserDisc
This is a list of the best-selling LaserDisc (LD) titles in the United States.

UMD
This is a list of the best-selling films on Sony's proprietary Universal Media Disc (UMD) format for the PlayStation Portable (PSP) platform in the United States.

Best-selling films by year
This is a list of the best-selling video titles sold on physical media (including VHS, DVD and Blu-ray) in the United States by year.

1984–1985

1988–1996

1993–1995

1996–1997

2006

2007

2008

2009

2010

2011

2012

2013

2014

2015

2016

2017

2018

2019

2020

2021

2022

Best-selling film series (VHS)

See also
 List of highest-grossing films in the United States
 List of best-selling albums in the United States
 Walt Disney Classics

References

Films in the United States
Top film lists
Films